Jeroen Robert Kramer (born 1967 in Amsterdam) is a Dutch contemporary photographer.
He started his career as a freelance photographer for the Dutch quality daily De Volkskrant which sent him to Iraq to cover the invasion in 2003. Since then he has worked extensively in the Middle east. He is most famous for his work for magazines and newspapers such as The New York Times, Vanity Fair and Der Spiegel that has taken him to many conflict zones in the past decade, including Afghanistan, Kenya, Lebanon, Iraq, the Philippines and Pakistan.

In 2008 Kramer decided he no longer wanted to work as a documentary photographer. This led to the publication of his book Room 103 in which he mixes ordinary life in the Middle east with images of violence. In his opinion his earlier work focused too much on violence and thereby created a distorted view of the world. With Room 103, he gives an intimate view of life in the Middle east. The book was awarded the top Dutch documentary award, The Dutch Doc award and the New York Photo festival book award.

Selected bibliography
Une Femme 
Beyrouth objets trouvés 
Dutch Heights 2010 
Room 103 
La vita nuda 
Act of faith 
Nazar

Awards
2011 Dutch art council grant.
2010 New York Photo Festival book award.
2010 Dutch doc award.
2007 Zilveren Camera
2005 Zilveren Camera.
2004 Fuji award.

Selected exhibitions
2016 Museum for Photography Amsterdam
2012 Museum of contemporary art Rome
2012 Breda photo festival
2011 Q contemporary art gallery (Lebanon)
2011 New York Photo Festival (United States)
2010 Umam Documentation & Research (Lebanon)
2009 Noorderlicht (The Netherlands)
2008 Triennale di Milano (Italy)
2007 Act of Faith ( The Netherlands)
2005 Fotofest Houston Texas (United States)
2004 Nazar Noorderlicht (The Netherlands)

References

External links

http://www.lorientlejour.com/archives/overview.php?id=A650611
https://web.archive.org/web/20120305140327/http://www.vpro.nl/programma/deavonden/afleveringen/42560827/items/42836161/
http://programma.ntr.nl/424/kunststof/detail/aflevering/10379832/Kunststof
http://cgi.omroep.nl/cgi-bin/streams?/ikon/OBAlive/20091210/room103.wmv
http://www.ikonrtv.nl/radio747live/program.asp?lIntEntityId=1240
http://www.noorderlicht.com

1967 births
Living people
Dutch photojournalists
Photographers from Amsterdam